The campaign of the Carolinas (January 1 – April 26, 1865), also known as the Carolinas campaign, was the final campaign conducted by the United States Army (Union Army) against the Confederate States Army in the Western Theater. On January 1, Union Maj. Gen. William T. Sherman advanced north from Savannah, Georgia, through the Carolinas, with the intention of linking up with Union forces in Virginia. The defeat of Confederate Gen. Joseph E. Johnston's army at the Battle of Bentonville, and its unconditional surrender to Union forces on April 26, 1865, effectively ended the American Civil War.

Background
After Sherman captured Savannah, the culmination of his 'March to the Sea', he was ordered by Union Army general-in-chief Lt. Gen. Ulysses S. Grant to embark his army on ships to reinforce the Army of the Potomac and the Army of the James in Virginia, where Grant was bogged down in the Siege of Petersburg against Confederate General Robert E. Lee. Sherman had bigger things in mind. He predicted on January 5, 1865: "I do think that in the several grand epochs of this war, my name will have a prominent part." He persuaded Grant that he should march north through the Carolinas instead, destroying everything of military value along the way, similar to his 'March to the Sea' through Georgia. Sherman was particularly interested in targeting South Carolina, as the first state to secede from the Union, for the effect it would have on Southern morale.

Sherman's army commenced toward Columbia, South Carolina, in late January 1865. His 60,079 men were divided into two wings: the Army of the Tennessee,  and two corps, the XIV and XX, under Maj. Gen. Henry W. Slocum, which was later formally designated the Army of Georgia. Reinforcements arrived regularly during his march north, and by April 1 he commanded 88,948 men after the Army of the Ohio under Maj. Gen. John M. Schofield joined up at Goldsboro, NC.

Sherman's opponents on the Confederate side had considerably fewer men. The primary force in the Carolinas was the battered Army of Tennessee, again under the command of Gen. Joseph E. Johnston (who had been relieved of duty by Confederate President Jefferson Davis during the Atlanta campaign against Sherman and restored after John Bell Hood led a disastrous invasion of Tennessee). His strength was recorded in mid-March at 9,513 and 15,188 by mid-April. The army was organized into three corps, commanded by Lt. Gen. William J. Hardee, Lt. Gen. Alexander P. Stewart, and Lt. Gen. Stephen D. Lee. Also in the Carolinas were cavalry forces from the division of Maj. Gen. Wade Hampton and a small number in Wilmington, North Carolina, under Gen. Braxton Bragg.

Sherman's plan was to bypass the minor Confederate troop concentrations at Augusta, Georgia, and Charleston, South Carolina, and reach Goldsboro, North Carolina, by March 15. As with his Georgia operations, Sherman marched his armies in multiple directions simultaneously, confusing the scattered Confederate defenders as to his first true objective, which was the state capital of Columbia, South Carolina.

Opposing forces

Union

Confederate

Battles

The following battles were fought in the Carolinas campaign.

Rivers' Bridge (February 3, 1865)

The Confederate division of Maj. Gen. Lafayette McLaws attempted to prevent the crossing of the Salkehatchie River by the right wing of Sherman's army. The Union division under Maj. Gen. Francis P. Blair (Howard's army) crossed the river and assaulted McLaws' flank. McLaws withdrew to Branchville, causing only one day's delay in the Union advance.

On February 17, Sherman captured Columbia, SC and Hampton's cavalry retreated from the city. Union forces were overwhelmed by throngs of liberated Federal prisoners and emancipated slaves. Many soldiers took advantage of ample supplies of liquor in the city and began to drink. Fires began in the city, and high winds spread the flames across a wide area. Most of the central city was destroyed, and the city's fire companies found it difficult to operate in conjunction with the invading Union army, many of whom were also trying to put out the fire. The burning of Columbia has engendered controversy ever since, with some claiming the fires were accidental, others stating they were a deliberate act of vengeance as in Atlanta, and others claiming that the fires were set by retreating Confederate soldiers who lit bales of cotton on their way out of town. On that same day, the Confederates evacuated Charleston. On February 18, Sherman's forces destroyed virtually anything of military value in Columbia, including railroad depots, warehouses, arsenals, and machine shops. On February 22, Wilmington, NC surrendered.

Aiken (February 11)

This battle took place entirely in South Carolina. During the Battle Hugh Judson Kilpatrick attacked the city of Aiken. Cavalry corps and the Aiken Home Guard, which were under the command of Joseph Wheeler fought Kilpatrick's cavalry corps. Wheeler formed his troopers into a "V" formation, and deployed skirmishers in front of his cavalry. He planned for Kilpatrick to attack the skirmishers, who would then retreat to the center of the "V." His cavalry would then charge and surround Kilpatrick's force. When the battle started, a Confederate soldier shot his gun prematurely. This resulted in Wheeler ordering all his soldiers to attack the Union army. They engaged in hand-to-hand combat. Kilpatrick was defeated and forced back to Montmorenci.

Wyse Fork (March 7–10)

Schofield planned to advance inland from Wilmington, NC, in February. At the same time, he assigned Maj. Gen. Jacob D. Cox to direct Union forces from New Bern toward Goldsboro. On March 7, Cox's advance was stopped by divisions under Gen. Braxton Bragg's command at Southwest Creek south of Kinston, North Carolina. On March 8, the Confederates attempted to seize the initiative by attacking the Union flanks. After initial success, their attacks stalled because of faulty communications. On March 9, the Union forces were reinforced and beat back Bragg's renewed attacks on March 10 after heavy fighting. Bragg withdrew across the Neuse River and was unable to prevent the fall of Kinston on March 14.

Monroe's Cross Roads (March 10)

As Sherman's army advanced into North Carolina, Maj. Gen. Judson Kilpatrick's Cavalry Division screened its left flank. On the evening of March 9, two of Kilpatrick's brigades encamped near the Charles Monroe House in Cumberland (now Hoke) County. Early on March 10, Hampton's Confederate cavalry surprised the Federals in their camps, driving them back in confusion and capturing wagons and artillery. The Federals regrouped and counterattacked, regaining their artillery and camps after a desperate fight. With Union reinforcements on the way, the Confederates withdrew.

Averasborough (March 16)

On the afternoon of March 15, Kilpatrick's cavalry came up against Hardee's corps deployed across the Raleigh Road near Smithville. After feeling out the Confederate defenses, Kilpatrick withdrew and called for infantry support. During the night, four divisions of the XX Corps arrived to confront the Confederates. At dawn, March 16, the Federals advanced on a division front, driving back skirmishers, but they were stopped by the main Confederate line and a counterattack. Mid-morning, the Federals renewed their advance with strong reinforcements and drove the Confederates from two lines of works, but they were repulsed at a third line. Late afternoon, the Union XIV Corps began to arrive on the field but was unable to deploy before dark because of the swampy ground. Hardee retreated during the night after holding up the Union advance for nearly two days.

Bentonville (March 19–21)

While Slocum's advance was stalled at Averasborough by Hardee's troops, the right wing of Sherman's army under Howard marched toward Goldsboro. On March 19, Slocum encountered the entrenched Confederates of Gen. Joseph E. Johnston who had concentrated to meet his advance at Bentonville. Johnston had increased his forces to about 21,000 men by absorbing the troops under Bragg, who had abandoned Wilmington. Late afternoon, Johnston attacked, crushing the line of the XIV Corps. Only strong counterattacks and desperate fighting south of the Goldsborough Road blunted the Confederate offensive. Elements of the XX Corps were thrown into the action as they arrived on the field. Five Confederate attacks failed to dislodge the Federal defenders, and darkness ended the first day's fighting. During the night, Johnston contracted his line into a "V" to protect his flanks, with Mill Creek to his rear. On March 20, Slocum was heavily reinforced, but fighting was sporadic. Sherman was inclined to let Johnston retreat. On March 21, however, Johnston remained in position while he removed his wounded. Skirmishing heated up along the entire front. In the afternoon, Maj. Gen. Joseph Mower led his Union division along a narrow trace that carried it across Mill Creek into Johnston's rear. Confederate counterattacks stopped Mower's advance, saving the army's only line of communication and retreat. Mower withdrew, ending fighting for the day. During the night, Johnston retreated across the bridge at Bentonville. Union forces pursued at first light, driving back Wheeler's rearguard and saving the bridge. Federal pursuit was halted at Hannah's Creek after a severe skirmish. Sherman, after regrouping at Goldsboro, pursued Johnston toward Raleigh.

Aftermath
Sherman's Carolina campaign, in which his troops marched  in 50 days, was similar to his march to the sea through Georgia, although physically more demanding. However, the Confederate forces opposing him were much smaller and more dispirited. When Joseph E. Johnston met with Jefferson Davis in Greensboro on April 12–13, he told the Confederate president:

On April 18, three days after the assassination of President Abraham Lincoln, Johnston signed an armistice with Sherman at Bennett Place, a farmhouse near Durham Station. Sherman faced political resistance for offering terms of surrender to Johnston that encompassed political issues as well as military, without authorization from General Grant or the United States government. The confusion on this issue lasted until April 26, when Johnston agreed to purely military terms and formally surrendered his army and all Confederate forces in the Carolinas, Georgia, and Florida. It was the second significant surrender that month. On April 9, Robert E. Lee had surrendered the Army of Northern Virginia at Appomattox Court House. It was the virtual end for the Confederacy, although some smaller forces held out, particularly in the Trans-Mississippi region, into the summer.

Notes

References

Further reading

 Bradley, Mark L. Last Stand in the Carolinas: The Battle of Bentonville. Savas Woodbury Publishers, 1996. .
 Bradley, Mark L. This Astounding Close: The Road to Bennett Place. University of North Carolina Press, 2006. .
Eicher, David J. The Longest Night: A Military History of the Civil War. New York: Simon & Schuster, 2001. .
Lucas, Marion B., with Anne S. Rubin. Sherman and the burning of Columbia. Columbia: University of South Carolina Press, 2021. .
 Moore, Mark A., with Jessica A. Bandel and Michael Hill. The Old North State at War: The North Carolina Civil War Atlas. Raleigh: North Carolina Department of Cultural Resources, Office of Archives and History, 2015. .
 Smith, Mark A., and Wade Sokolosky. No Such Army Since the Days of Julius Caesar: Sherman's Carolinas Campaign from Fayetteville to Averasboro, March 1865, rev. ed. El Dorado Hills, CA: Savas Beatie, 2017. . First published 2006 by Ironclad Publishing.
 Taylor, Paul. Orlando M. Poe: Civil War General and Great Lakes Engineer. Kent, OH: Kent State University Press, 2009. .

External links

Government
Official website of the Bennett Place State Historic Site

General information
Campaign of the Carolinas from the American Battlefield Trust
Sherman's March to the Sea New Georgia Encyclopedia entry

 
1865 in the American Civil War
1865 in North Carolina
1865 in South Carolina
January 1865 events
February 1865 events
March 1865 events
April 1865 events
William Tecumseh Sherman
Campaigns of the Western Theater of the American Civil War
Military operations of the American Civil War in North Carolina
Military operations of the American Civil War in South Carolina
Strategic operations of the Union Army in the American Civil War
Union victories of the American Civil War